Hibbertia potentilliflora is a species of flowering plant in the family Dilleniaceae and is endemic to the west of Western Australia. It was first formally described in 1863 by George Bentham in Flora Australiensis from specimens collected from the Swan River Colony by James Drummond and from near the Murchison River by Augustus Oldfield. The specific epithet (potentilliflora) means "Potentilla-flowered".

Hibbertia potentilliflora grows in a range of soils on rocky hillsides and coastal sandstone in the Avon Wheatbelt and Geraldton Sandplains biogeographic regions of western Western Australia. It is classified as "not threatened" by the Western Australian Government Department of Parks and Wildlife.

See also
List of Hibbertia species

References

potentilliflora
Flora of Western Australia
Plants described in 1863
Taxa named by George Bentham